The Society of Former Political Prisoners and Exiled Settlers was a public organization in the Soviet Union that worked in 1921–1935.

History
The society was organized by Pavel Maslov (born 1890), Dmitry Novomirsky, and others. The opening took place in Moscow in the House of Unions on March 12, 1921.

In 1921, the society had 200 members. Among them were prominent participants in the revolutionary movement, like Vladimir Vilensky (Sibiryakov), Vera Figner, Lev Deich, Nikolai Tyutchev, Felix Kon, Mikhail Frolenko, Anna Yakimova-Dikovskaya, Alexander Pribylev, Anna Pribyleva-Korba, Fedor Petrov, Vadim Bystryansky, Nikolai Skrypnik, Ivan Theodorovich, Vladimir Zhdanov. The society was led by the Council. Since 1924, the society transformed into an all-Union organization; in 1928 it had over 50 branches. Its members delivered reports and lectures to workers, students, and Red Army soldiers. In 1924, 1925, 1928, 1931, all-union congresses of society took place.

In 1926, the society founded a museum with a library and archive. With the Society of Old Bolsheviks, the Society of Former Political Prisoners and Exiled Settlers created the International Organization of Assistance to the Fighters of the Revolution (1922).

Former political prisoners rested in the Mikhailovskoye estate, which belonged to Count Sergei Sheremetyev before the revolution. Today, the Mikhailovskoye sanatorium is located at the estate.

Just before the society disbanded, the House of Political Prisoners on Revolution Square was built for them in Leningrad.

The society was disbanded in 1935. During the Great Purge, 130 former members of the Society were executed, and another 90 were sent to forced labour camps. The last chairman of the society was Alexander Andreyev.

Activities of society
Provided material assistance to former political convicts and exiled settlers, organized lectures and reports, collected, stored, studied and published materials on the history of the imperial prison, penal servitude and exile.

The society published the magazines "Hard Labour and Exile" and "Bulletin of the Central Council of the All-Union Society of Former Political Prisoners and Exiled Settlers" and the series "Historical and Revolutionary Library" and "Classics of the Revolutionary Thought of the Pre-Marxist Period". Compositions and materials were also published on the life and work of Alexander Herzen, Nikolai Chernyshevsky, Nikolai Dobrolyubov, Mikhail Bakunin, Pyotr Tkachev, and Figner; five volumes of the bio-bibliographic dictionary "Figures of the Revolutionary Movement in Russia"; and memoirs and documents about the Decembrists, Narodism, the labor movement, the royal prison, penal servitude and exile.

Criticism
One of the oldest political prisoners in Tsarist Russia, Vera Figner, wrote in response to a proposal to join the society after its reorganization due to the increasing role of the bolsheviks:

However, on page 664 of the 1934 edition of the Biographical Directory of Society Members, Figner is listed as a member of the society with ticket No. 2901.

See also
Memorial (organization)

References

Sources
Political Penal Servitude and Exile: Biographical Directory of Members of the Society of Political Prisoners and Exiled Settlers – Moscow, 1929
Political Penal Servitude and Exile. Biographical Directory of Members of the Society of Political Prisoners and Exiled Settlers, Moscow, 1934
All-Union Society of Political Prisoners and Exiled Settlers. Catalog of publications. 1921–1931, Moscow, 1931: the same, 1931–1934, Moscow, 1935

All-Union Society of Political Prisoners and Exiled Settlers. Formation, Development, Liquidation. 1921–1935. Links. 2004

Organizations established in 1921
1935 disestablishments